Canindé de São Francisco is a municipality located in the Brazilian state of Sergipe.

Conservation

The municipality holds part of the  Rio São Francisco Natural Monument, which protects the spectacular canyons of the São Francisco River between the Paulo Afonso Hydroelectric Complex and the Xingó Dam.
The municipality also contains the  Lagoa do Frio Municipal Nature Park, created in 2001.

References

Municipalities in Sergipe
Populated places established in 1953